Vižinada is a village and municipality in the interior of the western part of Istria, Croatia. It is 17 km northeast of Poreč, with an elevation of 400 m. The economy is agriculture-based.

Demographics
The total municipality population is 1,155, distributed in the following settlements:

 Bajkini, population 38
 Baldaši, population 28
 Brig, population 115
 Bukori, population 20
 Crklada, population 114
 Čuki, population 9
 Danci, population 13
 Ferenci, population 69
 Filipi, population 32
 Grubići, population 34
 Jadruhi, population 51
 Lašići, population 36
 Markovići, population 48
 Mastelići, population 0
 Mekiši kod Vižinade, population 39
 Nardući, population 19
 Ohnići, population 37
 Piškovica, population 0
 Staniši, population 22
 Trombal, population 0
 Velići, population 38
 Vižinada - Visinada, population 279
 Vranići kod Vižinade, population 0
 Vranje Selo, population 55
 Vrbani, population 12
 Vrh Lašići, population 38
 Žudetići, population 12

History and culture

The parish was first mentioned in 1177, in the papal document granting a privilege to the bishop of Poreč. Vižinada is located at the intersection of the main road Buje - Pula (M2, E751) and a local road toward Poreč.
Despite various attempts at defacing stone effigies of the Lion of St Mark in the square and church interior, the township and its environs were under Venetian control at various periods throughout history.
Traditional events are: Versi na sterni, festival of poetry, as well as folk feasts Krostulijada, St. Mary and St. Valentine.

In popular culture

In 1969, various locations in Vižinada was used as sets during the filming of the heist film Kelly's Heroes; the village was used as a stand-in for the French town of Clermont, with the script having a German-held bank full of gold bullion being up for grabs. Yugoslavia itself had been chosen for a shooting location for, among other reasons, that at the time it was one of the few nations whose army still possessed operational WWII-era tanks and other vehicles suitable for use in the film. Vižinada today remains mostly the same as it was in the production, as seen in the photograph of the church square, in which the confrontation with the Tiger tank takes place.

The photograph shows Vižinada as seen in the film. The church tower is where the characters Cowboy (Jeff Morris) and Gutowski (Richard Davalos) are positioned, overlooking the town square, and the bank. To the right of the photograph, where the gentleman is standing, the Tiger Tank was sitting, as the three men (Kelly, Oddball and Big Joe) approached it to confront the commander.

References

External links

 Tourist info

Municipalities of Croatia
Populated places in Istria County
Italian-speaking territorial units in Croatia